KUNG is the English transcription of the Cyrillic initialism КУНГ for  (unified body of zero [standard] dimension). The KUNG is a Soviet then Russian term for a standardized military vehicle module/trailer system.

The most widespread standard frame-metal body-van is assembled from steel angles and angle bars, steering aluminum sheets outside, but inside - impregnated varnished plywood. The voids between the sheathing panels are filled with insulating foam. All bodies, regardless of specialization are supplied with heating, ventilation, lighting and ceiling light household equipment.
KUNGs are manufactured for installation on the chassis of GAZ-63, ZIL-157, GAZ-66, ZIL-131, KAMAZ-4310, Ural-375, Ural-4320. Versions for different vehicles are standardized with the same type of items and equipment.

KUNG body type: wood and metal, insulated, sealed, heated and are designed for placement of personnel, repair shops, electronic systems, health centers, etc.

Also the term kung is used informally for an accessory for civilian vehicles, pickup trucks - a metal or fiberglass roof on the body.

Gallery

References

Recreational vehicles
Trucks